Comfort Allen "C.A." McMillen was born on January 12, 1818, in Washington County, Arkansas to Lewis McMillen and Charlotte Joy. McMillen married Lydia Maxwell. McMillen and Lydia started their journey to Texas in 1845 and arrived on January 1, 1846, on the banks of a creek (now called Maxwell Creek). The McMillen family were able to get land at the cost of 25 cents an acre. The families near the creek built a robust farming community called Old Decator (present day Murphy, Texas).

Large amounts of his land were given to the city of Murphy for industrial usage. Some of his land was given to the Corinth Presbyterian Church (one of the oldest church congregations of Collin County) in Parker, Texas, where he was a founding member known for his pious nature and devotion to the Bible. His wife, Lydia, died in 1907. McMillen died in 1914.

McMillen High School, founded in 2011, in Plano, Texas is named in honor of the farmer, businessman, and church founder.

Sources

1818 births
1914 deaths
McMillen, C. A.
People from Washington County, Arkansas
People from Collin County, Texas
19th-century American businesspeople